River Rangpo is a river in the Indian state of Sikkim. A tributary of the Teesta River, it originates from Menmecho Lake near Dzuluk and flows through Rongli and Pakyong subdivision villages in Pakyong District towards Rorathang, Kumrek and Rangpo.  The river demarcates the  border between Pakyong District of Sikkim and Kalimpong district of West Bengal  from Rorathang   to Rangpo. At the town of Rangpo the river joins river Teesta. River Rangpo is the third largest river of Sikkim after Teesta and Rangeet. Atal Setu Bridge the longest roadway bridge of sikkim lies over River Rangpo. 

The river runs through Pakyong District of Sikkim and a few parts of the Kalimpong District of West Bengal. This tributary flows mainly from east to west with a variable channel pattern including braided, meandering, straight, gorge and blocked lake. Landslides are very common along the river bank as cliff-like bedrocks are significantly exposed along the river valley wall.

During Monsoon season especially from June to September, the volume of water in the river and its tributaries rises heavily due to continuous rainfall in Sikkim.

The important towns along the route of this river are Rangpo, Rorathang, Rongli, Kumrek etc in Pakyong District of Sikkim.

Its confluence with Teesta River is immediately downstream of Rangpo town, the confluence point is known as Indrakil Prayag.

At the town of Rangpo, there is a bridge across River Rangpo, the bridge is called Atal Setu Bridge or Rangpo IBM Bridge and it is the longest bridge of Sikkim.

Course
The river originates from Lake Menmecho near Dzuluk in Gangtok district of Sikkim. It flows down towards the villages of Pakyong District like Latuk, Rolep, Losing, Chochenpheri, Chujachen and reaches the town of Rongli, where it is joined by a river called Rongli Khola. It further flows through villages of Sudunglakha, Mulukay, Bering, Tareythang, Tarpin where the river is fed my many tributaries like River Richu, River Donok, River Ralang, River Pachey, River Khaarey and it reaches the town of Rorathang, where it is joined by one of its largest tributary- Reshi River. From here the river forms border between Pakyong District of Sikkim and Kalimpong District of West Bengal, flowing through villages like Bhasmay, Kashyong, Kumrek, Lower Mansong, Chanatar etc and other small rivers like Kumrek khola, Pool Khola etc joins and than the river finally reaches the town of Rangpo, where it joins river Teesta.

Hydropower Project 
A 110 MW Gati Hydropower Project lies on river Rangpo, The project site is between the town of Rorathang and Rongli of Pakyong District in  Sikkim.
 A 96 MW Madhya Bharat Power Corporation Project Power house lies in Kumrek on the right bank of River Rangpo.

References 

Rivers of Sikkim
Pakyong district
Braided rivers in India
Rivers of India
Tributaries of the Teesta River
Rivers of Kalimpong district
Rivers of West Bengal